The 2022 San Francisco District Attorney special election was held on November 8, 2022, following the successful recall of San Francisco District Attorney Chesa Boudin. It was held concurrent with the 2022 statewide general elections.

Following Boudin's removal from office, Mayor London Breed appointed Brooke Jenkins as the interim District Attorney on July 8, 2022. After winning the special election, Jenkins will serve the remainder of the unexpired term until January 2025.

Candidates

Declared 
As of the filing deadline, these candidates were listed on the San Francisco Department of Elections webpage

 Joe Alioto Veronese, civil rights attorney, former member of the San Francisco Police Commission, San Francisco Fire Commission, and California Council on Criminal Justice, grandson of former San Francisco mayor Joseph Alioto, and son of former San Francisco supervisor Angela Alioto (Party affiliation: Democratic)
 Maurice Chenier, corporate attorney and candidate for District Attorney in 2007 (Party affiliation: Independent)
 John Hamasaki, criminal defense attorney and former member of the San Francisco Police Commission (Party affiliation: Democratic)
 Brooke Jenkins, interim District Attorney (Party affiliation: Democratic)

Declined 
 Chesa Boudin, former District Attorney

Endorsements

Polling

Results

Notes

References 

San Francisco District Attorney special
2022 in San Francisco
San Francisco District Attorney special
District Attorney 2022 special
San Francisco District Attorney 2022